First Kilrea Presbyterian Church is a church building of the Coleraine and Limavady presbytery of Presbyterian Church in Ireland. It is located in the village of Kilrea, County Londonderry, Northern Ireland.

History 
The first Meeting House built for Presbyterians in the Kilrea district was at Moyknock. In 1642 the first church building at Moyknock was burned down. A second church was built in the townland of Boveedy, just outside modern-day Kilrea. This building served the parishes of Kilrea, Tamlaght, Boveedy and Desertoghill. The third meeting house, the first in Kilrea was built in 1770. The building stood a short distance in front of the present church.

The present-day church building or "Scot's Kirk" (English: Scottish [or 'Presbyterian'] Church) as it was called had its foundation stone laid in 1837 and opened for worship in 1839. The funding for the church was provided by the Mercers' Company and built to a design by William Barnes of London.

Ministers

References

External links  
 Geograph First Kilrea Presbyterian Church
 First Kilrea Boys Brigade Company

Presbyterian churches in Northern Ireland
Gothic Revival church buildings in Northern Ireland
Churches in County Londonderry